Edward Lawrence Sudol (September 13, 1920 – December 10, 2004) was an American baseball umpire who worked in the National League from 1957 to 1977. Sudol umpired 3,247 major league games in his 21-year career, wearing uniform number 16 for most of his career. He umpired in three World Series (1965, 1971, and 1977), three League Championship Series (1969, 1973, and 1976) and three All-Star Games (1961, 1964 and 1974).  Sudol was also the home plate umpire for Jim Bunning's perfect game in 1964, as well as Bill Singer's no-hitter in 1970. In 1974, he was the second base umpire when Hank Aaron broke Babe Ruth's career home run record.

As Sudol realized his playing career was drawing to a close, he enrolled in an umpiring school in Daytona Beach, and after umpiring in the minor leagues for multiple years, was called up to the National League in 1957.

Sudol died on December 10, 2004, in Daytona Beach; he had been suffering from Alzheimer's disease.

See also 

 List of Major League Baseball umpires

References

External links
The Sporting News umpire card
Obituary
Retrosheet
Former MLB Umpire Ed Sudol & His Epic Mets Games Behind the Plate 
Ed Sudol Oral History Interview (1 of 2) - National Baseball Hall of Fame Digital Collection
Ed Sudol Oral History Interview (2 of 2) - National Baseball Hall of Fame Digital Collection

1920 births
2004 deaths
Deaths from Alzheimer's disease
Deaths from dementia in Florida
Major League Baseball umpires
Sportspeople from Passaic, New Jersey
Sportspeople from Daytona Beach, Florida
Allentown Cardinals players
Austin Pioneers players
Baltimore Orioles (IL) players
Cambridge Canners players
Charleston Rebels players
El Dorado Oilers players
Greenville Bucks players
Hartford Bees players
Jacksonville Tars players
Minot Mallards players
Pampa Oilers players
Pocomoke City Chicks players
Portsmouth Cubs players
Poughkeepsie Giants players
Rock Hill Chiefs players
Savannah Indians players
Scranton Miners players
Sherman–Denison Twins players
Stamford Bombers players
Tarboro Orioles players
Wilkes-Barre Barons (baseball) players
Wilmington Blue Rocks (1940–1952) players